The Internet History Sourcebooks Project is located at the Fordham University History Department and Center for Medieval Studies. It is a web site with modern, medieval and ancient primary source documents, maps, secondary sources, bibliographies, images and music. Paul Halsall is the editor, with Jerome S. Arkenberg as the contributing editor.  It was first created in 1996, and is used extensively by teachers as an alternative to textbooks.

Internet Medieval Sourcebook
The Internet Medieval Sourcebook or IMS is a web site with Medieval source documents, maps, secondary sources, bibliographies, images and music.  It is located at the Fordham University Center for Medieval Studies.

Because most translations are under copyright, a large number of the documents on IMS are older copyright-expired versions from the 19th and early 20th century, and other more recent and perhaps readable translations exist for sale through book sellers. However, IMS also has a section of "recently translated texts" which have been translated just for IMS. In fact, IMS claims it "contains more newly-translated texts than any available published collection of medieval sources."

Internet Ancient Sourcebook

Internet Modern Sourcebook

Other Sourcebooks
In addition to the large collections in the Medieval, Ancient, and Modern Sourcebooks, the Internet History Sourcebooks Project also includes Sourcebooks on African, East Asian, Global, Indian, Islamic, Jewish, Lesbian and Gay, Science, and Women's History.

External links
Internet History Sourcebooks Project.
Internet Medieval Sourcebook.
Internet Ancient Sourcebook.
Internet Modern Sourcebook.

Fordham University
Medieval studies literature
Discipline-oriented digital libraries
Computing in classical studies
American digital libraries